Gholam-Ali Farivar was an Iranian engineer and politician.

Early life and education 
Farivar was born in 1905 or 1906 in a middle-class family in Enzeli, Gilan Province. He studied engineering at University of Paris.

Career  
He was one of the early leaders of Iran Party, having previously been a member of the Comrades Party's central committee. In the 1944 Iranian legislative election, he was elected to the parliament along with five other fellow members of Iran Party. He was among figures who played a role in establishment of the United Front of Progressive Parties, a coalition including the communist Tudeh Party of Iran.

He served as industry minister in the cabinet of Ali Amini. For some time, he was also chairman of board of directors of Mortgage Bank of Iran, as well as an advisor to the Ministry of Commerce.

After the Iranian Revolution, Farivar was appointed as the ambassador to Switzerland.

References 

 

20th-century Iranian engineers
1900s births
Year of birth uncertain
Year of death missing
People from Bandar-e Anzali
Iran Party politicians
National Front (Iran) politicians
University of Paris alumni
Members of the 14th Iranian Majlis
Comrades Party politicians
Government ministers of Iran
Ambassadors of Iran to Switzerland
Deputies of Tehran for National Consultative Assembly
Iranian expatriates in France